The New Zealand Mountain Guides Association (NZMGA) provides training programmes and certification for professional Mountain and Ski Guides in New Zealand.

History
The NZMGA was established in 1974 and joined the IFMGA in 1981.  The first professional guide in New Zealand was Ulrich Kaufmann, a Swiss guide, who attempted the first ascent of Aoraki / Mount Cook in 1882.

References

External links
 NZMGA official web site

Mountain guides associations
Mountaineering in New Zealand